Taha Carım (1914-1977) was a Turkish diplomat who held several high-ranking posts in Turkish foreign service and was assassinated by Armenian gunmen from Justice Commandos of the Armenian Genocide.

Biography
Carım was born in 1914 in Geneva in a family of a diplomat. After completion of his studies at Galatasaray High School, he went on to study in France, eventually graduating from University of Toulouse. During the World War II on 29 October 1941, Carım joined the foreign service and would continue working at the ministry for 36 years until his death..
He started his service at the General Secretariat Department and was soon sent to Trade Department where he rose to the rank of 3rd secretary.
In 1948, Carım was sent to work at the Turkish Consulate in Athens. In 1952, after receiving the first rank, he was sent to lead the embassy in Alexandria and the same year he started representing Turkey in NATO. In 1957, Carım was appointed Ambassador of Turkey to Caracas, representing Turkey in Venezuela, Haiti, Ecuador and Colombia. In 1960–1961, he served as an Ambassador in Karachi, in 1961–1965 in Ottawa and in 1965–1976 in Beirut. In 1971, during the conference on Armenian issues at the Academy of Foreign Affairs, he delivered a speech about centuries old tradition of coexistence of Turkish and Armenian people.

Assassination

On 9 June 1977, Taha Carım was returning to his residence and was ambushed by two Armenian gunmen from front and back. He was shot and killed instantly. The responsibility was claimed by JCAG.

In 2016, the papacy finally condemned of the 1977 assassination of Taha Carım in order to resolve a dispute with Turkey about the Armenian genocide.

See also
 Assassination of Ismail Erez
 Assassination of Daniş Tunalıgil
 List of ambassadors of Turkey to Canada
 List of assassinated people from Turkey
 List of diplomatic missions of Turkey
List of Turkish diplomats assassinated by Armenian militant organisations

References 

1914 births
1977 deaths
Turkish people of Ubykh descent
20th-century Turkish diplomats
Terrorist attacks attributed to Armenian militant groups
Assassinated Turkish diplomats
Turkish people murdered abroad
People murdered in Lazio
Galatasaray High School alumni
Ambassadors of Turkey to Canada
Ambassadors of Turkey to Colombia
Ambassadors of Turkey to Ecuador
Ambassadors of Turkey to Haiti
Ambassadors of Turkey to Lebanon
Ambassadors of Turkey to Pakistan
Ambassadors of Turkey to Venezuela
Ambassadors of Turkey to the Holy See
Turkish people of Circassian descent
Expatriates from the Ottoman Empire in Switzerland